Iliyan Kapitanov (born 25 January 1992) is a Bulgarian footballer who plays as a winger for Litex Lovech.

Career

Cherno More
In November 2009, Cherno More's manager Velizar Popov selected Ilian in the main squad and on 28 March 2010, Kapitanov made his debut in the A PFG at the age of 17 against Minyor Pernik, coming as a 61st min substitute.

Dobrudzha
In January 2017, Kapitanov joined Dobrudzha Dobrich.

Botev Galabovo
On 3 July 2017, Kapitanov signed with Botev Galabovo.

Litex
In June 2018, Kapitanov joined Litex.

International career
Having previously been capped at Bulgaria under-17 level Kapitanov made his first appearance for the Bulgaria under-19 side on 30 March 2010 in a 0–1 loss against Finland under-19 in a friendly game in Pravets.

References

External links

1992 births
Living people
People from General Toshevo
Bulgarian footballers
Bulgaria youth international footballers
Bulgaria under-21 international footballers
Association football wingers
PFC Cherno More Varna players
FC Lyubimets players
FC Sozopol players
FC Chernomorets Balchik players
PFC Dobrudzha Dobrich players
FC Botev Galabovo players
FC Oborishte players
PFC Litex Lovech players
First Professional Football League (Bulgaria) players
Second Professional Football League (Bulgaria) players